Thimiri is a village in Hosdurg taluk of Kasaragod district in Kerala state, India. Thimiri is located 3 km east of Cheruvathur on Cheruvathur-Cheemeni road.

Demographics
As of 2011 Census, Thimiri village had total population of 5,511 which constitutes 2,640 males and 2,871 females. The sex ratio of Thimiri was 1087, higher than state average of 1084. In Thimiri, Population of children under 6 years was 10.6%. Thimiri had overall literacy of 93% where male literacy stands at 96.3% and female literacy was 89.9%.

Administration
Thimiri village is part of Kayyur-Cheemeni Grama Panchayat in Nileshwaram Block Panchayat. Thimiri village is politically a part of Thrikaripur (State Assembly constituency) which belongs to Kasaragod Loksabha constituency.

Transportation
NH 66 is easily accessible from Cheruvathur town. Mangalore and Mumbai can be accessed on the northern side and Kochi and Trivandrum on the southern side. 
The nearest railway station is Cheruvathur railway station on Shoranur-Mangalore Section under Southern railway.
The nearest international airports are at Kannur and Mangalore.

References

Cheruvathur area
Villages in Kasaragod district